The Immaculate Room is a 2022 American psychological thriller film written and directed by Mukunda Michael Dewil. The film stars Emile Hirsch, Kate Bosworth, Ashley Greene, and M. Emmet Walsh.

Plot
Mikey and Kate are a couple in their thirties who have been selected to participate in a challenge devised by a famous professor. The challenge is to stay in a room called the Immaculate Room for 50 days. If they succeed, they will win five million dollars; if one of them gives up and leaves, the remaining participant will win one million dollars. The Immaculate Room is a plain white room with a bed, bathroom, food dispenser, and robotic overhead announcer, but nothing besides basic necessities. Mikey and Kate are initially certain they can win the money, but as the days go on, they become bored and miserable, with no form of entertainment and only tasteless food that comes in a carton.

Mikey finds a bug and wants to leave the room briefly to release it, but gets into an argument with Kate because she does not want him to be disqualified; this culminates in Kate accidentally stepping on the bug, upsetting Mikey. Mikey decides to spend $100,000 from the prize fund on a “treat”, which ends up being a green crayon. Though Kate thinks the treat was unnecessary, Mikey is happy and creates drawings all over the white wall. One day, a gun appears on the bathroom counter, disturbing Kate. She wants to get rid of it in the laundry chute, but is told by the overhead announcer that it is not allowed; they kick it under the bed instead.

One day, the room plays prerecorded messages from Mikey and Kate's loved ones. The first message is from Mikey’s older sister, who thinks Mikey and Kate are still broken up and urges him to use his time in the room to reflect on his personal trauma. The second message is from an old man in a homeless shelter, and causes Kate to become agitated and start crying uncontrollably. Kate admits that the man is her estranged father, who was an alcoholic and spent all her family's money during her childhood; Mikey comforts her. 

As Mikey becomes more bored, Kate tells him to take another treat. An attractive naked woman enters the room and claims to be an actress named Simone who knows nothing about the room. Mikey gives her his shirt, and Kate is distrustful. They all sleep in the bed together, with Kate in the middle. Kate takes a treat, which turns out to be MDMA. Though she cautions Mikey not to take it, the three of them do so and Mikey has an emotional breakdown while high, screaming that he wants to leave the room. Afterwards, Kate tells Simone about Sean, Mikey’s brother who died years ago while Mikey was supposed to be watching him. A few days later, Simone is gone, and a message is left on the wall that says “No one has ever made love to me like that before, S-XOX.” Kate accuses Mikey of sleeping with Simone and pushes him, causing him to hit his head on the ground and start bleeding. He is hurt that she doesn't trust him, and tells her the room has made them worse people and he is leaving with or without her. Kate threatens him with the gun and says he is not allowed to throw away millions of dollars, but cannot bring herself to shoot him as he leaves. Kate miserably stays in the room alone and, one day, stands in front of the red "quit" button, holding out her hand as if to press it.

In a flash-forward, Kate has just visited her father in the homeless shelter and runs into Mikey, who she has not seen in a long time. Mikey asks if she finished the challenge and won the money, but she avoids the question and asks how his sister is doing. A plaque is shown on the shelter as they walk away, stating that the new kitchen was built using money from an anonymous donor, implied to be Kate.

In the last shot, a new couple enters the room, feeling excited.

Cast
 Emile Hirsch as Michael 'Mikey' Walsh
 Kate Bosworth as Katherine 'Kate' Frith
 Ashley Greene Khoury as Simone
 M. Emmet Walsh as Harry Frith
 Joel David Moore as Jason Wright

Production
Principal photography began on December 16, 2020, and concluded on January 26, 2021.

Release
The film had its world premiere at the Mammoth Film Festival on February 3, 2022. On February 18, Screen Media Films acquired the film's distribution rights.

Reception
The film received mixed to negative reviews.

References

External links
 

2022 films
2022 psychological thriller films
2020s English-language films
American psychological thriller films
Films shot in Los Angeles
2020s American films